Cheang Hong Lim JP (1825 – 11 February 1893) was a Chinese opium merchant and philanthropist in Singapore. He was recognised by the British colonial administration as head of the local Hokkien Chinese community.

Biography
Cheang was born to Cheang Sam Teo, a Chinese migrant from the Changtai District of southern Fujian, China. He was the eldest of four sons born to his mother Bek E Neo. 
When his father died, his brother Cheang Hong Guan filed a lawsuit against Cheang (and against Wee Bock Seng, Low Thuan Locke and Tan Beng Chie) alleging forgery of his father's will. Cheang, Wee, Low and Tan were acquitted.

Like his father before him, Cheang sold spirits, but further extended his business to include opium and held one of five opium licenses in Singapore, but quickly expanded his business interests to include property. His main business partners were Tan Seng Poh and Tan Yeok Nee, initially trading under the name "Chop Teang Wat Wan Kee" on Telok Ayer Street and later "Chop Wan Seng".

He is remembered primarily for his philanthropy. In 1876, he donated $900 to the Portuguese Mission Church of St Jose. Also in 1876, he donated $3000 to convert the land in front of the Police Office to become a public garden, and to supply two gardeners to maintain the grounds thereafter. This is the garden now known as Hong Lim Park. In 1878, he donated $2,750 to purchase the land on Pyeleang Road for the use by a mosque.
He established a fire brigade for the Havelock Road area in 1886. Giok Hong Tian,, a Taoist temple dedicated to the Jade Emperor along Havelock Road was built by Cheang in 1887. He was also patron to the young Lim Boon Keng, at the request of Richmond William Hullett, the then principal of Raffles Institution, .

He sat on the Singapore legislative council, was made one of five Chinese Justices of the Peace in 1872, and was conferred the title of Ronglu mandarin of the Imperial Qing court. He was prominent in Singapore society and entertained the Governor of Singapore and the Sultan of Johor at his home on Havelock Road.

Cheang died on 14 February, 1893, from cardiac complications of rheumatic fever. Cheang had 3 daughters and 11 sons. Three of his sons, Cheang Jim Hean, Cheang Jim Chuan, Cheang Jim Khean, had roads in Singapore named after them.

Legacy
There are a number places in Singapore named for Cheang :
 Hong Lim Green (later Hong Lim Park)
 Hong Lim Market
 Cheang Wan Seng Place

There were formerly a number of places in Singapore named for Cheang:
 Hong Lim Quay (now part of Alkaff Quay)
 Cheang Hong Lim Street (used to run from Telok Ayer Steet to Cecil Street, where China Square Food Centre is now)
 Cheang Hong Lim Lane (used to run from Pearl’s Hill Road to Covent Market)
 Cheang Wan Seng Road (used to run from Havelock Road to Beng Hoon Road)

Cheang Hong Lim was buried at the Cheang family cemetery off Alexandra Road, but was exhumed and reburied in 1961 at Bukit Brown by his granddaughter Cheang Tew Muey.

Notes

References

1825 births
1893 deaths
Chinese merchants
Chinese philanthropists
Singaporean people of Chinese descent